Ficus atricha, commonly known as the rock breaker fig, is a tree in the family Moraceae native to northwestern Australia. It is a banyan of the genus Ficus which contains around 750 species worldwide in warm climates, including the edible fig (Ficus carica).

References

External links

Rosales of Australia
Trees of Australia
Flora of Western Australia
atricha
Drought-tolerant trees